Sheffield City Council elections took place on Thursday 5 May 2016, alongside nationwide local elections. All 84 seats were up for election, 3 per ward, after several electoral boundaries were changed.  Labour, the Liberal Democrats and the Green Party contested all 84 seats. The Conservatives fielded 55 candidates, UKIP 43, TUSC 23 and Yorkshire First 1. There was also 1 independent candidate. Voters in the Sheffield Brightside and Hillsborough Parliamentary constituency also elected Gill Furniss MP, in a by-election triggered by the death of her husband Harry Harpham MP.

Election results

The result had the following consequences for the total number of seats on the Council after the elections:

Retiring councillors

Labour 
 Ibrar Hussain, Burngreave
 Geoff Smith, Crookes
 Sheila Constance, Firth Park
 Steve Jones, Gleadless Valley
 Jenny Armstrong, Manor Castle
 Nikki Bond, Nether Edge
 John Campbell, Richmond
 Lynn Rooney, Richmond
 Gill Furniss, Southey
 Ray Satur, Woodhouse

Liberal Democrats 
 Rob Frost, Crookes
 Katie Condliffe, Stannington

Greens 
 Sarah Jane Smalley, Central

Ward results

Beauchief & Greenhill
Richard Shaw, Julie Gledhill and Roy Munn were sitting Beauchief & Greenhill councillors.

Beighton
Helen Mirfin-Boukouris, Ian Saunders and Chris Rosling-Josephs were sitting Beighton councillors.

Birley
Bryan Lodge, Denise Fox and Karen McGowan were sitting Birley councillors.

Broomhill & Sharrow Vale
Aodan Marken and Brian Webster were sitting Broomhill councillors.

Burngreave
Jackie Drayton and Talib Hussain were sitting Burngreave councillors.

City
Robert Murphy was a sitting Central councillor.

Crookes & Crosspool
Anne Murphy was a sitting Crookes councillor.

Darnall
Mazher Iqbal and Mary Lea were sitting Darnall councillors.

Dore & Totley
Colin Ross, Joe Otten and Martin Smith were sitting Dore & Totley councillors.

East Ecclesfield
Steve Wilson and Pauline Andrews were sitting East Ecclesfield councillors.
Sioned-Mair Richards was a sitting Shiregreen & Brightside councillor.

Ecclesall
Roger Davison and Shaffaq Mohammed were sitting Ecclesall councillors.

Firth Park
Alan Law was a sitting Firth Park councillor.

Fulwood
Sue Alston, Andrew Sangar and Cliff Woodcraft were sitting Fulwood councillors.

Gleadless Valley
Lewis Dagnall was a sitting Central councillor, Chris Peace and Cate McDonald were sitting Gleadless Valley councillors.

Graves Park
Ian Auckland and Steve Ayris were sitting Graves Park councillors.

Hillsborough
Bob Johnson, George Lindars-Hammond and Josie Paszek were sitting Hillsborough councillors.

Manor Castle
Pat Midgley and Terry Fox were sitting Manor Castle councillors.

Mosborough
Tony Downing, David Barker and Isobel Bowler were sitting Mosborough councillors, Denise Reaney was a sitting Graves Park councillor.

Nether Edge & Sharrow
Nasima Akther and Mohammad Maroof were sitting Nether Edge councillors.

Park & Arbourthorne
Julie Dore and Jack Scott were sitting Park & Arbourthorne councillors.

Richmond
Mike Drabble was a sitting Arbourthorne councillor, Dianne Hurst was a sitting Darnall councillor, Peter Rippon was a sitting Shiregreen & Brightside councillor.

Shiregreen & Brightside
Peter Price was a sitting Shiregreen & Brightside councillor, Garry Weatherall was a sitting Firth Park councillor.

Southey
Tony Damms and Leigh Bramall were sitting Southey councillors, Jayne Dunn was a sitting Broomhill councillor.

Stannington
David Baker and Vickie Priestley were sitting Stannington councillors, Penny Baker was a sitting Ecclesall councillor.

Stocksbridge & Upper Don
Jack Clarkson, Keith Davis and Richard Crowther were sitting Stocksbridge & Upper Don councillors, Katie Condliffe was a sitting Stannington councillor.

Walkley
Olivia Blake, Ben Curran and Neale Gibson were sitting Walkley councillors.

West Ecclesfield
Adam Hurst, John Booker and Zoe Sykes were sitting West Ecclesfield councillors.

Zoe Sykes won on a drawing of lots, shown as gaining an addition vote.

Woodhouse
Michael Rooney and Jackie Satur were sitting Woodhouse councillors, Paul Wood was a sitting Richmond councillor.

By-elections between 2016 and 2018

Mosborough

Death of Labour Cllr Isobel Bowler.

Southey
Resignation of Labour Cllr Leigh Bramall.

Nether Edge and Sharrow
Resignation of Labour Cllr Nasima Akther.

Beighton
Resignation of Labour Cllr Helen Mirfin-Boukouris.

References

2016 English local elections
2016
2010s in Sheffield